Pemmican Bluff is a short but prominent bluff with steep rock north face and sloping snow south slope. It overlooks the west side of upper Basecamp Valley just west of Pillsbury Tower, in the Jones Mountains. Mapped by the University of Minnesota-Jones Mountains Party, 1960–61. So named by this party because the bluff is composed of complex volcanic rocks giving the north face a very mottled appearance similar to the pemmican eaten in the field.

Cliffs of Ellsworth Land